
This is a list of the 46 players who earned 1995 PGA Tour cards through the PGA Tour Qualifying Tournament in 1994.

 PGA Tour rookie in 1995

1995 Results

*PGA Tour rookie in 1995
T = Tied
 The player retained his PGA Tour card for 1996 (finished inside the top 125, excluding non-members)
 The player did not retain his PGA Tour card for 1996, but retained conditional status (finished between 126-150, excluding non-members)
 The player did not retain his PGA Tour card for 1996 (finished outside the top 150)

Winners on the PGA Tour in 1995

Runners-up on the PGA Tour in 1995

See also
1994 Nike Tour graduates

References

PGA Tour Qualifying School
PGA Tour Qualifying School Graduates
PGA Tour Qualifying School Graduates